Stephanie "Steffi" Ofenböck (born 17 March 1981) is an Austrian female handball player. She was a member of the Austria women's national handball team. She was part of the  team at the 2000 Summer Olympics, playing seven matches. On club level she played for Hypo Niederösterreich in Maria Enzersdorf.

References

1981 births
Living people
Austrian female handball players
Handball players at the 2000 Summer Olympics
Olympic handball players of Austria
Handball players from Vienna